Dennis Moore may refer to:

 Dennis Moore (actor) (1908–1964), American actor who appeared in many Western films between 1936 and 1957
 Dennis Moore (politician) (1945–2021), member of the United States House of Representatives from Kansas
 "Dennis Moore", an  episode of the British television programme Monty Python's Flying Circus, as well as a character in that episode

See also
 Denis Moore (1910–2003), English cricketer